Fin is the debut studio album by American R&B singer Syd. It was released on February 3, 2017, by Columbia Records.

Background
After Ego Death, the members of the Internet decided that they would venture on solo projects to flesh out their individual styles. When speaking about what the album would entail, Syd stated:"This album is not that deep, but I feel like this is my descent into the depth I want the band to get to... For me, this is like an in-between thing — maybe get a song on the radio, maybe make some money, have some new shit to perform."

The album has a more pop-influenced feel in comparison to her output with the Internet. However, Syd states that she has always been influenced by pop, and that the album is inspired by popular artists from her time, including Usher and Brandy. Influences of trap also appear throughout, most notably on the single "All About Me".

"All About Me" was released as Fins lead single on January 11, 2017. A music video for the song was released a day earlier on Syd's Vevo page. On January 24, "Body" was released as the album's second single. The song's audio was also released on the singer's Vevo page.

Release and reception

Fin was released by Columbia Records on February 3, 2017, to widespread critical acclaim. At Metacritic, which assigns a normalized rating out of 100 to reviews from mainstream publications, the album received an average score of 81, based on 10 reviews. Reviewing Fin for NPR, Lars Gotrich wrote that Syd "has an affinity for the '90s R&B singers who kept their emotions open and voices close, like Aaliyah (see 'Know') or the ladies in TLC ('Smile More', 'Nothin' To Somethin'') — embracing the limitations of their range, but finding the core of the performance via self-styled confidence". In Vice, Robert Christgau found the singer distinct from contemporary R&B's "voice-plus-sound" aesthetic, particularly because of her "soft and slender" voice, "her brave sighs and whispers", and "how easily her voice carries this music unaugmented by her former guitar and drum kit". He appreciated her themes of financial success and especially love, while naming "Dollar Bills" the album's highlight.

Accolades

Track listing

Charts

References

2017 debut albums
Columbia Records albums
Syd albums
Albums produced by Steve Lacy
Albums produced by Syd tha Kyd
Albums produced by Hit-Boy